Da Nang International Airport  is located in Da Nang, the largest city in central Vietnam.  It is the third international airport in the country, besides Noi Bai International Airport (Hanoi) and Tan Son Nhat International Airport (Ho Chi Minh City), and is an important gateway to access central Vietnam.

In addition to its civil aviation, the runway is shared with the Vietnamese People's Air Force (VPAF, the Không Quân Nhân Dân Việt Nam), although military activities are now extremely limited.
The airport served 5 million passengers in 2014, reaching that passenger count around six years sooner than expected. An expansion of the new terminal is currently considered to increase its capacity to 10 million passengers per annum by 2020.
This airport handled 6,722,587 passengers in 2015, an increase of 34.7% compared with that of 2014.

This airport handled 11 million passengers in 2017, an increase of 24.1% compared to that of 2016. The airport has two separate terminals for international and domestic passengers with total passenger capacity of 11 million per annum as at 2018. The Hanoi-Danang and Ho Chi Minh City-Danang routes have respectively 319 and 250 weekly flights and are, in order, the second and third busiest air routes in Vietnam after the Hanoi-Ho Chi Minh route (475 flights).

History

Colonial French 
Situated on flat, sandy ground on the south side of the major port city of Da Nang, the area was ideal for an airfield, having unobstructed approaches to its north–south runways. Tourane Airport was built by the French colonial government in the 1940s as a civilian airport. During World War II, and the Japanese occupation of French Indochina, the Imperial Japanese Army Air Force used it as a military air base.

After the war, the facility was used by the French Air Force during the French Indochina War (1945–1954). In 1953/54 the French laid a NATO-standard  asphalt runway at Tourane and stationed loaned American B-26s "Invaders" of the Groupe de Bombardement 1/19 Gascogne. In 1954 after the Geneva Peace Accords, these B-26s were returned to the United States.

Vietnam War 
In 1955, the newly established Republic of Vietnam Air Force (VNAF) inherited from the French a token force of fifty-eight aircraft. These included a few squadrons of Cessna L-19 observation aircraft, C-47 transports and various utility aircraft. Tourane Airfield was turned over to civilian use, with the South Vietnamese using facilities at Bien Hoa, Nha Trang and at Tan Son Nhut, near Saigon.

In 1957 the VNAF re-established a presence at the renamed Da Nang Airport, stationing the 1st Liaison Squadron with Cessna L-19s. The South Vietnamese Army (ARVN) also used Da Nang as a ranger training facility.

Air Vietnam also used the facility from 1951 to 1975 for civilian domestic and international flights within Southeast Asia.

During the Vietnam War (1959–1975), the facility was known as Da Nang Air Base, and was a major United States military base.

During the war the VNAF's 1st Air Division, and the USAF's 23d Air Base Group, 6252nd Tactical Wing, 35th Tactical Fighter Wing, 366th Tactical Fighter Wing, 362nd Tactical Electronic Warfare Squadron, and the U.S. Navy (a detachment of VQ-1) operated from the base.

COVID-19 pandemic 
According to the regulation of the Ministry of Transport issued on 27 July 2020, the airport was temporarily closed from 28 July to 7 September to prevent an outbreak in the city.

Facilities 

Da Nang International Airport has two  paved, parallel runways (17–35 orientation) capable of handling large, modern aircraft such as Boeing 747s, 767s and Airbus 320s. Traffic volume at Da Nang averages 100 to 150 flights every 24 hours. Annual traffic was circa 1.45 million in 2007 and is expected to reach four million by 2020.

A new 20,000m² terminal, costing US$84 million with a capacity of 4 million passengers per year, opened to receive its first domestic flight on 15 December 2011. The feasibility study for the renovation of the airport was partially sponsored by the United States Trade and Development Agency (USTDA), and was completed by PriceWaterhouseCoopers in 2006. The new terminal includes five boarding gates, baggage handling systems, departure and arrivals areas, flight information display system (FIDS), common user terminal equipment (CUTE), fire detection systems and comprehensive public address and security systems, including screening equipment. After completion, and at a cost of US$160 million, the airport now has a total capacity of six million passengers per year.

A new international terminal 2, covering 48,000m2, with a total investment sum of US$154 million and a designed capacity of 6 millions passenger per year was put into use on 5 May. 2017.

Airlines and destinations

Statistics

Accidents and incidents
On 30 September 1970, Douglas DC-3DST B-305 of Air Vietnam crashed into a hill near Da Nang while attempting to divert to Da Nang Airport due to weather conditions at its intended destination of Phu Bai Airport, Huế. Three of the 38 people on board were killed.

References

External links

 
 
 
 Danang Airport To Hoi An

Buildings and structures in Da Nang
Airports in Vietnam